The 2018 Hammersmith and Fulham Council election took place on 3 May 2018 to elect members of Hammersmith and Fulham Council in London.

Overall results

Labour consolidated control of the council by gaining 9 seats (in addition to the 11 they gained in 2014), winning 35 in all. The Conservatives lost 9 seats, winning 11 in all. This was the lowest number of Conservative councillors since 1986.

There were no wards with split party representation – for only the fourth time in the fifteen elections since the council was created in 1968. The previous occasions when this occurred was 1990, 1978 and the 1971 Labour landslide.

Another sign of the increased homogeneity was the number of wards where the winning party got less than 50% of the vote – just three wards this time. Ravenscourt Park with 46%, Town with 48% and Sands End with a fraction under 50%. This compares with the 2014 election when there were 6 wards including Sands End with 38%. In the 2010 election there were 10 wards including Addison with 39%. And in the 2006 election there were also 10 wards including Askew with 39%.

26 Councillors successfully retained their seats – 20 Labour and 6 Conservative.
5 sitting Councillors were defeated – all Conservative, including the previous opposition leader.

The ward with the highest percentage vote for one party was Wormholt and White City which saw a 76.5% vote share for the Labour Party. This is the highest percentage any party has achieved at the five elections since these wards were established in 2002. Vote share percentages by ward for previous elections are not currently available.

The largest percentage change was in the Shepherds Bush Green ward, where the Labour Party increased its vote share by 20.9 percentage points – as the Green Party did not stand a candidate this time round. The largest percentage decrease was in the Fulham Reach ward where the Conservative vote dropped by 14.6 percentage points.

The candidate with the largest individual tally was Lisa Homan with 2,577 votes in the Askew ward.  This veteran councillor has been elected on all but one occasion since 1994 – losing out in 2002 by 44 votes.

One of the successful Conservative candidates in Palace Riverside had been deselected from the same ward in 2006, and had run as an independent candidate – coming within 146 votes of winning at that election.

The Liberal Democrats fielded a full slate of 46 candidates – in 2014 they put forward 39 candidates for election.

UKIP fielded 3 candidates – in 2014 they had 7 candidates.

The Green Party fielded 2 candidates – in 2014 they had 7 candidates.

There was 1 Independent candidate – the same number as in 2014, although a different individual.  The 2018 independent had previously run in the same ward in the 2006 local election and in the Hammersmith constituency at the 2017 general election.

TUSC did not stand any candidates in the 2018 local elections – they had two candidates in Hammersmith and Fulham in 2014.

National Health Action Party did not field candidates in the 2018 local elections – they had a single candidate in Hammersmith and Fulham in 2014.

Ward results
(*) represents a candidate seeking re-election in the same ward.

(~) represents a candidate seeking re-election in a different ward.

Addison

Askew

Avonmore and Brook Green

College Park and Old Oak

Fulham Broadway

Fulham Reach

Hammersmith Broadway

Munster

North End

Palace Riverside

Parsons Green and Walham

Ravenscourt Park

Sands End

Shepherds Bush Green

Town

Wormholt and White City

By-elections

Fulham Broadway

A by-election was held in Fulham Broadway after the resignation of Councillor Alan de'Ath on 19 September 2019.

Wormholt & White City

A by-election was held in Wormholt & White City following the death of Councillor Colin Aherne on 11 July 2021.

References

Hammersmith and Fulham
2018
21st century in the London Borough of Hammersmith and Fulham
May 2018 events in the United Kingdom